Mahassen Hala Fattouh (born 27 August 1989) is a Lebanese weightlifter. She represented Lebanon at the 2020 Summer Olympics in Tokyo, Japan. She competed in the women's 76 kg event, finishing 9th overall.

Born in the United States, she represents her father's home country of Lebanon.

She competed in the women's 63 kg event at the World Weightlifting Championships in 2014, 2015 and 2017. She also competed in the women's 64 kg event at this competition in 2018 and 2019.

In April 2021, she competed at the 2020 Asian Weightlifting Championships held in Tashkent, Uzbekistan.

She competed in the women's 71 kg event at the 2022 Mediterranean Games held in Oran, Algeria.

References

External links 
 

Living people
1989 births
Lebanese female weightlifters
Weightlifters at the 2020 Summer Olympics
Olympic weightlifters of Lebanon
Competitors at the 2022 Mediterranean Games
Mediterranean Games competitors for Lebanon
Mediterranean Games silver medalists for Lebanon
American people of Lebanese descent
Sportspeople of Lebanese descent
21st-century Lebanese women